

See also
 Export of cryptography from the United States

Temporary maintenance holdings